Bengt-Arne "B-A" Strömberg, born 13 February 1954 in Gothenburg, Sweden, was a Swedish former football player and coach of IFK Norrköping, IF Elfsborg and Floda IBK. He was  the only FIFA licensed coach in Sweden. After 25 years as football coach, Strömberg changed profession and became a lorry driver.

References
Much of the content of this article comes from the equivalent Swedish-language Wikipedia article.  Retrieved on 21 January 2018. Some of the following references are cited by that Swedish-language article:

1954 births
Living people
Swedish football managers
Footballers from Gothenburg